Estradiol 17-beta-dehydrogenase 12 is an enzyme that in humans is encoded by the HSD17B12 gene.

The enzyme 17-beta hydroxysteroid dehydrogenase-12 (HSD17B12) uses NADPH to reduce 3-ketoacyl-CoA to 3-hydroxyacyl-CoA during the second step of fatty acid elongation.[supplied by OMIM]

References

Further reading